(), named the Gebze-Orhangazi-İzmir Motorway and abbreviated as O-5, is a toll motorway in Turkey. Since being completed in 2019, it connects the Istanbul metropolitan area with İzmir, via Bursa and Balıkesir. The O-5 runs parallel to the D575 and the D565 for most of its length and is a major motorway in Turkey as it provides a direct connection between Istanbul and its surrounding metropolis to the country's 3rd largest (İzmir) and 4th largest (Bursa) cities, bypassing the Gulf of İzmit via the Osman Gazi Bridge. The O-5 also makes up part of the International E-road network E881.

The western part of the Bursa Beltway, which is part of the O-5, was completed during the 2000s. The rest of the O-5 has been under construction since the early 2010s, with the first portion opened from Altinova to Gemlik in April 2016. As of April 2017, the O-5 is open in two separate sections: the  section from its northern terminus in Gebze to Bursa, across the Osman Gazi Bridge along with a  section from Kemalpaşa to its southern terminus in İzmir. The final section, Karacabey to Akhisar, opened on August 5, 2019.

The O-5 is the most expensive toll motorway in Turkey as the price for a personal vehicle from Gebze to Izmir ,  367 ( 45.45), including the Osman Gazi Bridge toll of  147.50 ( 18.26).

Gebze-Orhangazi-İzmir Motorway Project details
The project includes the Osman Gazi Bridge, the Gebze-Bursa section and the Bursa-İzmir section of Otoyol 5. It is a build-operate-transfer project which was awarded to a consortium consisting of 5 companies (Nurol, Özaltın, Makyol, Göçay and Astaldi).

Key dates
Tender: 9 April 2009
Signing of contract: 27 September 2010
Date of effect: 15 March 2013
End of contract: 15 July 2035
Construction time: 7 years

Guaranteed traffic volumes
Gebze-Orhangazi (including bridge): 40000 PCU/day
Orhangazi-Bursa: 35000 PCU/day
Bursa-Balıkesir: 17000 PCU/day
Balıkesir-İzmir: 23000 PCU/day

Technical details
377 kilometres of motorway, 44 kilometres of connection roads
1 suspension bridge with a main span of 1,550 metres Osman Gazi Bridge
30 viaducts (18,212 metres)
3 tunnels (6,200 metres)
209 small bridges
18 toll plazas
7 service areas and 7 parking areas

Tunnels
Orhangazi Tunnel - 3,586 m (11,211 ft)
Selçukgazi Tunnel - 1,234 m (4,049 ft)
Belkahve Tunnel - ~1,700 m

Exit list

See also
 List of motorways in Turkey

References

External links

Marmara region road map
Bursa motorway map
Official page in Turkish

05
Transport in Kocaeli Province
Transport in Yalova Province
Transport in Bursa Province
Transport in Balıkesir Province
Transport in Manisa Province
Transport in İzmir Province
Toll roads in Turkey